"Viviré" ("I Will Live") is a song by Dominican Republic singer-songwriter Juan Luis Guerra released as the second single for his album Fogaraté (1994). It is a Spanish-language adaptation of "Vivi" by Congolese musician Papa Wemba with Guerra writing the song in Spanish. It became his first song to reach number-one on the Billboard Latin Pop Airplay in 1994. At the 1995 Latin Billboard Music Awards, "Viviré" won Tropical/Salsa Song of the Year. It was recognized as one best-performing Latin songs of the year at the 1996 BMI Latin Awards. The music video for the song was directed by Gustavo Garzón and received a nomination for Video of the Year at the 1995 Lo Nuestro Awards. On the review of the album for the Miami Herald, Fernando Gonzalez called the song "the best of the lot". A writer for Music & Media described the track as a Cuban son.

Track listing 
 "Viviré" - 
 "Canto de Hacha"

Charts

See also
List of number-one Billboard Latin Pop Airplay songs of 1994

References 

1994 songs
1994 singles
Juan Luis Guerra songs
Spanish-language songs
Songs written by Juan Luis Guerra